Ian Norton (21 October 1937 – 29 December 2012) was an English cricketer. He played one first-class match for Oxford University Cricket Club in 1959.

References

External links
 

1937 births
2012 deaths
English cricketers
Oxford University cricketers
People from Stamford, Lincolnshire
Cricketers from Lincolnshire
Alumni of St Edmund Hall, Oxford